Camisa 10 Joga Bola Até na Chuva (Portuguese for "Shirt #10 Will Play Ball Even Under the Rain") is the ninth studio album by Brazilian alternative rock band Charlie Brown Jr. Released on September 26, 2009 through Sony Music, it was the band's only release through the label (until the posthumous Chegou Quem Faltava in 2021), their first with new drummer Bruno Graveto, and their final one with bassist Heitor Gomes, who left in 2011 after his contract expired to join CPM 22. Explaining the title, vocalist Chorão said that it came to him after he and his friend, Marcelo Falcão of O Rappa, met during a flight and saw in a magazine a picture of a footballer under the rain; he then thought it was a "fitting metaphor" on how people live their lives. The number 10 is a reference to the fact that it is their tenth album overall if the live release Acústico MTV is counted, and also nods to the iconic #10 shirt worn by footballer Pelé.

The album spawned two hit singles: "Me Encontra" and "Só os Loucos Sabem", one of the band's most famous compositions. Also notable is "O Dom, a Inteligência e a Voz"; Chorão originally wrote it in 2001 as a gift to his friend, fellow singer Cássia Eller, to be included on her sixth studio album, Dez de Dezembro. However, she died before she could record the song, and the album was released posthumously.

In 2010, Camisa 10 Joga Bola Até na Chuva won a Latin Grammy Award for Best Portuguese Language Rock or Alternative Album; the band's second release to win the award following Tamo Aí na Atividade. Selling over 100,000 copies, it received a Platinum certification by Pro-Música Brasil.

Track listing

Personnel
 Charlie Brown Jr.
 Chorão – vocals
 Thiago Castanho – electric guitar
 Heitor Gomes – bass guitar
 Bruno Graveto – drums

 Production
 Rick Bonadio – production, mixing, mastering
 Paulo Anhaia – recording, editing
 Nilton Baloni – studio assistant
 Lampadinha – mastering

Certifications

References

2009 albums
Sony Music Brazil albums
Charlie Brown Jr. albums
Albums produced by Rick Bonadio
Latin Grammy Award for Best Portuguese Language Rock or Alternative Album